Primitive may refer to:

Mathematics
 Primitive element (field theory)
 Primitive element (finite field)
 Primitive cell (crystallography)
 Primitive notion, axiomatic systems
 Primitive polynomial (disambiguation), one of two concepts
 Primitive function or antiderivative, F′ = f
 Primitive permutation group
 Primitive root of unity; See Root of unity
 Primitive triangle, an integer triangle whose sides have no common prime factor

Sciences
 Primitive (phylogenetics), characteristic of an early stage of development or evolution
 Primitive equations, a set of nonlinear differential equations that are used to approximate atmospheric flow
 Primitive change, a general term encompassing a number of basic molecular alterations in the course of a chemical reaction

Computing
 Cryptographic primitives, low-level cryptographic algorithms frequently used to build computer security systems
 Geometric primitive, the simplest kinds of figures in computer graphics
 Language primitive, the simplest element provided by a programming language
 Primitive data type, a datatype provided by a programming language

Art and entertainment
 Naïve art, created by untrained artists
 Neo-primitivism, an early 20th-century Russian art movement that looks to early human history, folk art and non-Western or children's art for inspiration
 Primitivism, an early 20th-century art movement that looks to early human history, folk art and non-Western or children's art for inspiration
 Primitive decorating, a style of decorating using primitive folk art style that is characteristic of a historic or early Americana time period
 Primitive, a novel by J. F. Gonzalez

Music
 The Primitives, a British indie rock band
 Primitive Radio Gods, an American alternative rock band

Albums
 Primitive (Neil Diamond album), by Neil Diamond 1984
 Primitive (Soulfly album), by Soulfly 2000

Songs
 "Primitive", by Accept from the 1996 album Predator
 "Primitive", by The Groupies and covered by The Cramps
 "Primitive", by Killing Joke from the 1980 album Killing Joke
 "Primitive", by Cyndi Lauper from A Night to Remember
 "Primitive", by Annie Lennox from the 1992 album Diva
 "Primitive", by Róisín Murphy from the 2007 album Overpowered

Religion
 Primitive Church, another name for early Christianity
 Restorationism, also described as Christian primitivism, is the belief that Christianity should be restored along the lines of what is known about the apostolic early church
 Primitive Baptist, a religious movement seeking to retain or restore early Christian practices
 Primitive Methodism

Other uses
 Primitive (philately)
 Anarcho-primitivism, an anarchist critique of the origins and progress of civilization
 Noble savage, a particular stock character in literature, i.e., a person uncorrupted by the influences of civilization
 Pre-industrial society
 Primitive communism, a pre-agrarian form of communism according to Karl Marx and Friedrich Engels
 Primitive Culture, an 1871 book by Edward Burnett Tylor.
 Primitive Skateboarding, a company located in Los Angeles

See also
 Primeval (disambiguation)
 Primitive Man (disambiguation)
 Primordial (disambiguation)